The 2004 Gerry Weber Open was a men's tennis tournament played on outdoor grass courts. It was the 12th edition of the Gerry Weber Open, and was part of the International Series of the 2004 ATP Tour. It took place at the Gerry Weber Stadion in Halle, North Rhine-Westphalia, Germany, from 7 June through 14 June 2004. First-seeded Roger Federer won the singles title.

Finals

Singles

 Roger Federer defeated  Mardy Fish 6–0, 6–3
It was Federer's 5th title of the year, and his 22nd overall. It was his 2nd consecutive win at the event.

Doubles

 Leander Paes /  David Rikl defeated  Tomáš Cibulec /  Petr Pála 6–2, 7–5
It was Paes' first title of the year and the 29th of his career. It was Rikl's first title of the year and the 22nd of his career.

References

External links
 Official website 
 ITF tournament edition details

 
Gerry Weber Open
Halle Open
2004 in German tennis